Liddalen is a valley in Sørkapp Land at Spitsbergen, Svalbard. It has a length of about 2.5 kilometers, and is located between Gavrilovfjellet and Lidfjellet. Liddalen is named after Norwegian botanist Johannes Lid.

References

Valleys of Spitsbergen